Bankrolled is a 2021 Mexican film directed and written by Marcos Bucaya and starring Aldo Escalante, Ricardo Polanco and Natalia Téllez.

Cast 
 Aldo Escalante as Polo Ríos
 Ricardo Polanco as Blas Solano
 Natalia Téllez as Natalia
 Fabrizio Santini as Aderales
 Seo Ju Park as Mayte
 María Chacón as Sandra
 Giuseppe Gamba as Cano
 Sebastián Zurita as Gus
 Benshorts
 María José Bernal
 Johana Fragoso Blendl
 Germán Bracco

Release
Bankrolled was released globally through Netflix on July 23, 2021.

References

External links
 
 

2021 films
Mexican comedy films
2020s Spanish-language films
Spanish-language Netflix original films